Michael Lou Martin (February 3, 1932 – May 27, 2015) was an American philosopher and former professor at Boston University. Martin specialized in the philosophy of religion, although he also worked on the philosophies of science, law, and social science.  He served with the US Marine Corps in Korea.

Biography

Life and academic career 
Martin completed a Bachelor of Science in Business Administration in 1956 at Arizona State University. He was awarded an MA in philosophy at the University of Arizona in 1958 and in 1962 he was awarded a Ph.D. in philosophy from Harvard University. He was appointed assistant professor at University of Colorado in 1962 and in 1965 he moved to Boston University. He was appointed Professor of Philosophy Emeritus after a lifelong career at Boston University. Martin died on 27 May 2015, aged 83.

He is the author or editor of a number of books, including Atheism: A Philosophical Justification (1989), The Case Against Christianity (1991), Atheism, Morality, and Meaning (2002), The Impossibility of God (2003), The Improbability of God (2006), and The Cambridge Companion to Atheism (2006). He sat on the editorial board of the philosophy journal Philo and wrote many reviews and articles for journals and magazines including Free Inquiry.

Atheism
In his Atheism: A Philosophical Justification, Martin cites a general absence of an atheistic response to contemporary work in philosophy of religion, and accepts the responsibility of a rigorous defense of non belief as his "cross to bear:"

The aim of this book is not to make atheism a popular belief or even to overcome its invisibility.  My object is not utopian.  It is merely to provide good reasons for being an atheist. … My object is to show that atheism is a rational position and that belief in God is not.  I am quite aware that atheistic beliefs are not always based on reason.  My claim is that they should be.Martin used the concepts of negative and positive atheism as proposed by Antony Flew rather than the terms weak or soft atheism (negative) and strong or hard atheism (positive).

Debates 
Martin took part in a number of written and internet debates with Christian philosophers.
 In 1991 Martin and Keith Parsons (founder of Georgia Skeptics and teacher of philosophy at Berry College (Rome, Georgia)) provided atheistic critiques to Douglas Jones' propositions on The Futility of Non Christian Thought in  a written debate, Is Non-Christian Thought Justifiable?, originally published in Antithesis magazine.
Martin had agreed to participate in a debate with Christian reconstructionist philosopher Greg Bahnsen on October 26, 1994, at Rhodes College in Memphis, TN.  Martin, however, pulled out of the debate on October 14, less than two weeks before the event was to have taken place, due to his stated objection to having the debate recorded.
 He conducted a debate with John M. Frame over the internet in a series of articles and responses around Martin's 1996 article, "The Transcendental Argument for the Nonexistence of God".
 An internet debate with Christian philosopher Phil Fernandes in 1997 over the existence of God was published as a book in 2000 titled: Theism vs. Atheism: The Internet Debate.

Academic Books
Martin, M., & Augustine, K. (2015). The Myth of an Afterlife: The Case against Life After Death, Rowman & Littlefield. 
Martin, M. (Ed) (2006). The Cambridge  Companion to Atheism.Cambridge: Cambridge University Press.   (Translated into Portuguese (2007), Finnish (2011), Croatian (2011))
Martin, M., & Monnier, R. (Eds.) (2006). The Improbability of God. Prometheus Books. 
Martin, M., & Monnier, R. (Eds.) (2003). The Impossibility of God. Amherst, NY: Prometheus Books. 
Martin, M. (2002). Atheism, Morality and Meaning. Amherst, NY: Prometheus Books. 
 Fernandes, P., & Martin, M. (2000). Theism vs. Atheism: The Internet Debate (Dr. Phil Fernandes vs. Dr. Michael Martin), Brenerton, WA: Ibd Press.  
 Martin, M. (2000). Verstehen: The Uses of Understanding in the Social Sciences. New Jersey: Transaction Books. 
 Martin, M. (1996). Legal Realism: American and Scandinavian. New York: Peter Lang. 
Martin, M., & McIntyre, L. (Eds) (1994). Readings in the Philosophy of Social Science. Cambridge: The MIT Press. 
Martin, M. (1991). The Case Against Christianity. Philadelphia: Temple University. 
 Martin, M. (1989). Atheism: A Philosophical Justification. Philadelphia: Temple University. 
Martin, M. (1987). The Legal Philosophy of H. L. A. Hart: A Critical Appraisal. Philadelphia: Temple University Press. 
Martin, M. (1978). Social Science and Philosophical Analysis:  Essays on The Philosophy of The Social Sciences Washington, D.C.: University Press Of  America. 
Martin, M. (1972). Concepts of Science Education: A Philosophical  Analysis. Chicago: Scott-Foresman. 
Martin, M., & Foster, M. (Eds) (1966). Probability, Confirmation and Simplicity. New York: Odyssey Press. ASIN: B000H03Q86

Fiction and Plays 
Martin published The Big Domino in the Sky: And Other Atheistic Tales in 1996. This is a collection of short stories in various styles presenting philosophical arguments. .

In 2011 Martin self-published a fiction novel,  Murder In Lecture Hall B, about a murder in the classroom of a philosophy professor whose interests are Religions and Atheism. 

Martin also wrote 8 short plays with moral or philosophical themes that are available on his website.

See also
 Atheist's Wager
 American philosophy
 List of American philosophers
 List of atheist philosophers

References

External links

 Martin's homepage, Boston University
 Martin's page from infidels.org, which contains a number of his critiques of theism 
 Martin's biography also from infidels.org, which lists his extensive collection of articles and reviews.
 Biography, philosophyofreligion.info.
 Obituary

1932 births
2015 deaths
20th-century American philosophers
American atheism activists
Analytic philosophers
Atheist philosophers
Boston University faculty
Christ myth theory proponents
Critics of Christianity
Harvard University alumni
Philosophers of religion
Philosophers of social science
Writers about religion and science